Giovanni Antonio Caldelli (1721-1791) was an Italian-Swiss painter, active in both figure and quadratura painting.

Biography
Born in Brissago in the Ticino in southern Switzerland. He was able to travel to the Netherlands and Austria for many years, working as both architect and painter. He gained the patronage from Prince Charles Alexander of Lorraine and Princess Carlotta his sister. He painted for the church of San Gottardo in Intragna, an in the church of Sant'Antonio and in the Casa Orelli in Locarno. He also completed works for his own house in Brissago in 1772. He designed an altar of the Holy Virgin da Ponte (1773). He is said to have merit as a Pittori di grido.

References

1721 births
1791 deaths
People from Ticino
18th-century Swiss painters
18th-century Swiss male artists
Swiss male painters
Quadratura painters